Karmyn Tyler (kærmɪn taɪlər) (born October 12, 1974) is an American singer and beauty pageant contestant who, as Miss Louisiana, represented her state at Miss America 1996 in September 1995. She was not a finalist but won a talent award for her operatic aria "Tu che di gel sei cinta". She was born in Hot Springs, Arkansas.

Tyler appeared as a female vocalist on the talent show Star Search in 1993. She won the pageant title Miss Texarkana Twin Rivers (Arkansas) in 1993. She recorded one vocal album, produced by William E. Johnson in 2004.

References

External links

 

1974 births
Living people
American beauty pageant winners
Miss America 1996 delegates
Miss Louisiana winners
People from Hot Springs, Arkansas
20th-century American people